The 1974 Army Cadets football team represented the United States Military Academy in the 1974 NCAA Division I football season. In their first year under head coach Homer Smith, the Cadets compiled a 3–8 record and were outscored by their opponents by a combined total of 306 to 156.  In the annual Army–Navy Game, the Cadets lost to the Midshipmen by a 19 to 0 score. 
 
No Army players were selected as first-team players on the 1974 College Football All-America Team.

Schedule

Personnel

Not listed (missing number/class/position): Gary Smithey

Season summary

Lafayette

vs Navy

75th meeting; President Gerald Ford in attendance

References

Army
Army Black Knights football seasons
Army Cadets football